Development financial institution (DFI), also known as a Development bank or Development finance company (DFC), is a financial institution that provides risk capital for economic development projects on a non-commercial basis.

DFIs are often established and owned by governments or nonprofit organizations to finance projects that would otherwise not be able to get financing from commercial lenders.  

They are often structured as a company that provides loans for projects that a government or nonprofit wants to encourage for non commercial reasons.  They can be at a local, national or international level.  DFIs include multilateral development banks, national development banks, bilateral development banks, microfinance institutions, community development financial institution and revolving loan funds.

History 
Development banks are a relatively new type of bank.  Early developments included agricultural and land development banks such as the land development banks in India which were established in 1920s.  One of the early international development banks was the French Development Agency which was established in December 1941 to finance projects in the French overseas provinces. 

In December 1945, the World Bank came into being, this became the largest development bank. In February 1948, the Commonwealth Development Corporation (CDC) was founded in London.

Mandate 
DFIs can play a crucial role in financing private and public sector investments in developing countries, in the form of higher risk loans, equity positions, and guarantees.

DFIs often provide finance to the private sector for investments that promote development and to help companies to invest, especially in countries with various restrictions on the market.

Some development banks include socially responsible investing, Environmental, social, and corporate governance (ESG) and impact investing criteria into their mandates. Governments often use development banks to form part of their development aid or economic development initiatives.

Climate financing 
, development banks and private finance had not reached the $100 billion USD per year investment of climate financing stipulated in the UN climate negotiations for 2020. However, in the face of the COVID-19 pandemic's economic downturn, 450 development banks pledged to fund a "Green recovery" in developing countries.

Typology 
Development banks include:

 Community development banks which fund low-income areas in the United States
 Land development banks which provide financing to develop agriculture in India
 National development banks are government-owned financial institution that provides financing for economic development.
 International financial institutions conducting development-oriented finance on a bilateral or multilateral basis
 Multilateral development bank are development banks set up by a group of countries and often operate under international laws.

See also 
 International Financial Institution
 Economic development
 Development aid
 Village banking

References

External links 
 World Federation of Development Financing Institutions (WFDFI)